A list of films produced in Brazil in 1935:

See also
 1935 in Brazil

External links
Brazilian films of 1935 at the Internet Movie Database

Brazil
1935
Films